Berrinba is a suburb in Logan City, Queensland, Australia.

History 
Berrinba was named as a suburb within the City of Brisbane on 1 November 1971 by the Queensland Place Names Board. The name Berrinba is an Aboriginal word meaning towards the south.

Berrinba East State School opened on 24 January 1977.

In 1979, Logan City Council and Brisbane City Council agreed to transfer Berrinba to Logan City in 1979, but it was not implemented until January 1997.

Berrinba East State School opened on 24 January 1977.

The population was 51.7% female and 48.3% male. The median age of the Berrinba population was 30 years of age, 7 years below the Australian median. 59.6% of people living in Berrinba were born in Australia, compared to the national average of 69.8%; the next most common countries of birth were New Zealand 6.5%, England 2.7%, India 2%, South Africa 1.8%, Fiji 1.7%. 67.5% of people spoke only English at home; the next most popular languages were 3% Mandarin, 2.2% Cantonese, 2.2% Hindi, 2.2% Arabic, 2.2% Samoan.

Education 
Berrinba East State School is a government primary (Prep-6) school for boys and girls at 165 Bardon Road. In 2018, the school had an enrolment of 456 students with 35 teachers (33 full-time equivalent) and 21 non-teaching staff (15 full-time equivalent). It includes a special education program.

There is no secondary school in Berrinba. The nearest government secondary school is Woodridge State High School in neighbouring Logan Central to the north-east.

In October 2020 approval was given to Al-Madinah Cultural, Educational and Welfare Institute Limited to establish the IQRA College of Brisbane at 97-109 Bardon Road. The school will be a co-education primary school (Prep-6) and expects to open on 24 January 2022.

Amenities 
Logan Central Multicultural Uniting Church is at 119 Bardon Road. It holds services in English, Samoan, and Tongan.

Wetlands 

Berrinba Wetlands is a man-made recreational park covering  along Scrubby Creek. Scrubby Creek joins Slacks Creek which enters the Logan River. The park contains  of walkways and bike tracks, nesting boxes and substantial bridges with rails designed to collapse during flooding if required. Non-native trees have been removed and more than 400,000 native plants were planted.

References

External links 

 

Suburbs of Logan City